Gudburovo (Götbör) is a rural locality (a village) in Bayguzinsky Selsoviet, Yanaulsky District, Bashkortostan, Russia. The population was 247 as of 2010. There are 2 streets.

Geography 
Gudburovo is located 12 km southwest of Yanaul (the district's administrative centre) by road. Urakayevo is the nearest rural locality.

References 

Rural localities in Yanaulsky District